Abyy (Abıy) is a rural locality (a selo) and the administrative center of Abyysky Rural Okrug of Abyysky District in the Sakha Republic, Russia, located  from Belaya Gora, the administrative center of the district. Its population as of the 2010 Census was 491; down from 498 recorded in the 2002 Census.

References

Notes

Sources
Official website of the Sakha Republic. Registry of the Administrative-Territorial Divisions of the Sakha Republic. Abyysky District. 

Rural localities in Abyysky District